Jim Bajor (1953 – 21 December 2006) was a new-age music pianist with some jazz influences. His self-released debut album Awakening received a Grammy nomination. In 1995 he performed on the 'Somewhere In Time' album, a cover version of Erroll Garner's 1954 Jazz standard Misty (song). He also worked with PBS on a special about the sinking of the SS Edmund Fitzgerald.

References

1953 births
2006 deaths
20th-century American pianists
American male pianists
20th-century American male musicians